The Canadian NINJAs (National International Nation of Jalapeño Awesomeness) were the professional wrestling tag team of Nicole Matthews and Portia Perez. They are former two-time Shimmer Tag Team Champions.

History

Shimmer Women Athletes
Nicole Matthews and Portia Perez initially began teaming together in Shimmer Women Athletes in October 2007. They met for the first time shortly before their debut, bonding over a meal at Denny's. Their first match together was a win against Ashley Lane and Lorelei Lee on Volume 15, and their second match was a loss against Ariel and Josie at Volume 16. Matthews and Perez named their tag team The Canadian NINJAs (National International Nation of Jalapeño Awesomeness) in March 2008.

On May 3, 2009 the duo won the Shimmer Tag Team Championship for the first time by defeating Ashley Lane and Nevaeh on Volume 26. They lost the titles on Volume 37 to the Seven Star Sisters (Hiroyo Matsumoto and Misaki Ohata) on March 27, 2011.

In July 2012 at Volume 48, The Canadian NINJAs received another shot at the Shimmer Tag Team Championship in a four corners tag team elimination match, Regeneration X (Allison Danger and Leva Bates) and The Queens of Winning (Courtney Rush and Sara Del Rey). The Queens won the title, but lost it to the NINJAs on July 7, 2013 at NCW Femmes Fatales's NCW-FF IX event. At Volume 57 on April 14, 2014, they lost the titles in a No Disqualification match against the Global Green Gangsters (Kellie Skater and Tomoka Nakagawa).

Other promotions
In early 2009 Matthews and Perez took part in the first season tapings of Wrestlicious, which began airing in March 2010. In the promotion, Matthews used the name Hope and Perez used the name Faith, and the duo's tag team name was The Naughty Girls. They debuted on the fifth episode on March 31 in a losing effort against the team of Charlotte and Paige Webb.

On September 23, 2011, the Canadian NINJAs made their Japanese debut for the Universal Woman's Pro Wrestling Reina promotion in the Reina World Tag Team Championship tournament, defeating Mia Yim and Sara Del Rey in their first round match. The following day, Perez and Matthews were defeated in the finals of the tournament by La Comandante and Zeuxis.

Championships and accomplishments
Shimmer Women Athletes
Shimmer Tag Team Championship (2 times)

References

Independent promotions teams and stables
Japanese promotions teams and stables
Women's wrestling teams and stables